Battle of Fort Erie may refer to one of the following battles at Fort Erie, Ontario, Canada:

 Battle of Fort Erie (1812), a battle during the War of 1812
 Capture of Fort Erie (1814), a later battle during the War of 1812
 Siege of Fort Erie (1814), immediately following the Capture of Fort Erie
 Battle of Fort Erie (1866), one of the Fenian raids